Min ko vill ha roligt (English: My cow wants to have fun) is a book written by Astrid Lindgren and  Kristina Forslund. It contains all articles concerning animal protection and mass production that Lindgren and Forslund wrote in the Swedish magazines Expressen and Dagens Nyheter from 1985 to 1989. Their activities led to a new Swedish law which was later called Lex Lindgren and was announced at Lindgren's 80th birthday.

Content 
On May 3, 1985, Astrid Lindgren wrote an article for the Dagens Nyheter magazine. She criticized the development of the so-called cow trainers, who are using electric shocks to force the cows to put their dung into the chute. In addition, she doesn't think it's right that the cows are often no longer able to be outside, but are locked up. Astrid Lindgren then receives a letter from Kristina Forslund, a veterinarian and lecturer at the University of Veterinary Medicine. Lindgren asks her to help her with an awareness campaign to promote better animal treatment in Sweden. At this point, Forslund is on the verge of giving up her career as a veterinarian. She is fed up with prescribing antibiotics and medication to animals whose real problem is improper animal husbandry. The only way how Forslund can imagine going on, is to change the things that she thinks are going wrong. A collaboration between Forslund and Lindgren follows, in which Astrid Lindgren brings in her journalistic skills and Forslund her specialist knowledge. From then on, they write and publish articles in the Swedish magazine Expressen. These articles are dealing with animal suffering and maximizing profits. In the articles, Lindgren and Forslund mainly criticize agricultural policy, the industrialization of agriculture and less the farmers, who, according to the authors, also want that the animals are well.

Background 
The book contains both articles that Astrid Lindgren and Kristina Forslund wrote for newspapers, as well as personal letters in which the authors criticize the treatment of animals in factory farming.

After the articles were published in the Swedish newspaper Expressen, Lindgren and Forslund put the articles together in chronological order. A comment was written behind each article on what happened after it was published. The authors also write about how they started to work together and how they feel about the change in the Animal Welfare Act. The book was first published in Sweden in 1990. It was translated into Dutch, German, Norwegian and parts of it in English.

Impacts of the articles 
The publication of the articles led to a new animal protection law in Sweden. It was presented to Astrid Lindgren on her 80th birthday and was called Lex Lindgren. During that time it was the strictest law concerning animal welfare in the world.

These are the most import things that were added to the law:
 §2 Animals should be treated well and protected against unnecessary suffering and illness.
 §4 Animals must be kept and cared for in a good animal environment and in such a way that it promotes their health and allows them to behave naturally.
 §13 When animals are brought to slaughter and when slaughtered, they shall be spared from unnecessary discomfort and suffering.

Forslund and Lindgren had fought for the new law for three years. However, they were not happy with it. A little had improved for some animals, but not enough and in most areas there was no improvement. For example, the right to graze was only granted to breeding animals, not to fattening animals. The size of the chicken cage was only increased much later and the slaughter regulations were kept too vague.

English Releases 
The book has not been released in English as a whole. However, some parts of it have been published in 1989 by the Animal Welfare Institute in the book How Astrid Lindgren achieved enactment of the 1988 law protecting farm animals in Sweden - a selection of articles and letters published in Expressen, Stockholm, 1985-1989.  The book contains 27 pages, while the Swedish book Min ko vill ha roligt contains 99 pages. Next to this Forslund has published a few of the articles on her website, where she also mentions what kind of changes came with the new law.

Editions 
 Astrid Lindgren & Kristina Forslund (1990): How Astrid Lindgren achieved enactment of the 1988 law protecting farm animals in Sweden. USA, Washington, D.C: Animal Welfare Institute (English, parts of the book only)
 Astrid Lindgren & Kristina Forslund (1990): En hij zag dat het niet goed was. Ploegsma, Amsterdam,  (Dutch)
 Astrid Lindgren & Kristina Forslund (1990): Min ko vill ha roligt. Rabén & Sjögren, Stockholm,  (Swedish)
 Astrid Lindgren & Kristina Forslund (1991): Meine Kuh will auch Spass haben. Oetinger, Hamburg,  (German)
 Astrid Lindgren & Kristina Forslund (1991): Kua mi vil ha det gøy. Damm,  (Norwegian)

Reception 
According to Brigitte Jakobeit from Die Zeit Min ko vill ha roligt is a book about the history of animal husbandry and where it led to. Furthermore, it is about profit making and politics. She believes that the book will be loved by children, adults and animal welfare activists.

Andreas Berger from the Braunschweiger Zeitung praises Lindgren's and Forslund's clearly written articles. Lindgren does not make any naive arguments, protecting the Swedish farmers who have reluctantly followed the new boom in factory farming. She praises their will for contributing to animal welfare and demands support from the state. She believes cruelty-free animal husbandry must be worthwhile. Astrid Lindgren reports very drastically on industrial pig slaughter. But sometimes she also chooses satirical formats. At one point Lindgren even writes about a dream in which God goes on an inspection trip and is horrified.

According to leseforum.isb.bayern.de the book is a sympathetic plea against factory farming. Even thirty years after it was published, it can encourage young people to get involved in this still important topic.

Istdasvegan.eu highly recommends the book because it deals with the topic in a child-friendly way, but it doesn't glorify or gloss over anything!

According to David Rudd the book, among Lindgren's other works, shows that there "are no privileged categories in Lindgren’s world, fictional or factual" and that "cows can want to have fun" too!

References

External links 
 My cow wants to have fun, parts of the book in English
 The animal figure in Astrid Lindgren’s work, article about the book and animal figures in Astrid Lindgren’s work in English

Swedish non-fiction books
Works by Astrid Lindgren
Rabén & Sjögren books
Books about animal rights
1995 non-fiction books